The 1977 NCAA Division I Men's Soccer Tournament was the nineteenth organized men's college soccer tournament by the National Collegiate Athletic Association, to determine the top college soccer team in the United States. Hartwick College won their first national title by defeating the San Francisco Dons, 2–1. The final match was played on December 4, 1977, in Berkeley, California, at California Memorial Stadium.

Early rounds

Championship Rounds

Third-Place Final

Final

See also  
 1977 NCAA Division II Soccer Championship
 1977 NCAA Division III Soccer Championship
 1977 NAIA Soccer Championship

References 

Championship
NCAA Division I Men's Soccer Tournament seasons
NCAA Division I men's
NCAA Division I Men's Soccer Championship
NCAA Division I Men's Soccer Tournament